The Place of Honour is a 1921 British silent adventure film directed by Sinclair Hill and starring Hugh Buckler, Madge White and Miles Mander. It is based on a short story by Ethel M. Dell set in British India.

Cast
 Hugh Buckler as Maj. Eustace Tudor  
 Madge White as Mrs. Tudor  
 Pardoe Woodman as Lt. Philip Trevor  
 Miles Mander as Lt. Devereaux  
 M. Gray Murray as Capt. Raleigh  
 Ruth Mackay as Mrs. Raleigh  
 Bob Vallis as Pvt. Archie Smith

References

Bibliography
 Low, Rachael. History of the British Film, 1918-1929. George Allen & Unwin, 1971.

External links

1921 films
1920s war adventure films
British war adventure films
British silent feature films
Films directed by Sinclair Hill
Films based on works by Ethel M. Dell
Films based on short fiction
British black-and-white films
Films set in India
Films shot at Cricklewood Studios
Stoll Pictures films
1920s English-language films
1920s British films
Silent war adventure films